Digerus gibberulus is an extinct species of air-breathing land snail, a terrestrial pulmonate gastropod mollusk in the family Odontostomidae. cf.

This species was endemic to Brazil; it is considered now extinct.

References 

Odontostomidae
Extinct gastropods
Endemic fauna of Brazil
Extinct animals of Brazil
Gastropods described in 1815
Taxonomy articles created by Polbot
Taxobox binomials not recognized by IUCN